Anat Lelior (born April 29, 2000) is an Israeli surfer. She represented Israel at the 2020 Summer Olympics, and finished 17th in the shortboard.

Early life
Lelior was born in Tel Aviv, Israel, to a Jewish family. Her mother is  painter Eti Jacobi, and her father is Yochai Lelior. She began surfing at the age of 5 when her father would take her out to the Mediterranean Sea at the coasts of her hometown Tel Aviv. Her younger sister Noa Lelior is a professional surfer as well, and in 2015 she decided to take the family to surfing contests abroad instead of having her Bat Mitzvah party - which in turn spearheaded her older sister Anat to a bigger stage in surfing. Lelior's surfing club Galim is owned by Shlomi Eyni and Inbar.

She serves as a soldier in the Israel Defense Forces.

Surfing career
Lelior was the 2018 World Surf League (WSL) Europe Pro Junior runner-up.

In 2019, she won the Burton Automotive Pro International Trials in Australia at Surfest. She also won the 2019 Deeply Pro Anglet, a WSL Qualifying Series (QS) 1,500 event at Chambre d’Amour.

2020 Olympic Games
Lelior qualified for the Surfing at the 2020 Summer Olympics by finishing as the highest-ranked surfer from Europe (Israel is considered part of Europe, according to International Olympic Committee protocol) and one of the top 30 surfers in the overall open division at the 2019 ISA World Surfing Games in Miyazaki, Japan.

References

External links
 
 Anat Lelior at BoardRiding.com
 
 
 
 
 

2000 births
Living people
World Surf League surfers
Israeli surfers
Israeli female surfers
Sportspeople from Tel Aviv
Jewish sportspeople
Israeli Jews
Olympic surfers of Israel
Surfers at the 2020 Summer Olympics